Sasha Roiz (born October 21, 1973) is an Israeli-born Canadian actor. He is best known for his portrayals of Sam Adama in the science-fiction TV series Caprica and Captain Sean Renard in the American fantasy TV series Grimm.

Early life
Roiz was born in Tel Aviv to Ukrainian Jewish parents. The family moved to Montreal in 1980. Roiz studied history before joining a theatre school in Montreal. He later graduated from the Guildford School of Acting in Guildford, Surrey.

Career
Roiz has appeared in a number of popular television dramas, including CSI: Miami, House, NCIS, The Mentalist, Lie To Me and Terminator: The Sarah Connor Chronicles. He had a recurring role on Warehouse 13 as Marcus Diamond.

In 2008, Roiz landed the role of Sam Adama on Caprica, a spin-off of Battlestar Galactica. His character is a Tauron enforcer for the Ha'la'tha crime syndicate on Caprica who frequently goes head-to-head with his lawyer brother Joseph Adama (played by Esai Morales), and is also the uncle of William Adama. On April 28, 2009, his role was expanded to series regular. Roiz stated in an interview that it was later revealed to him that his character would be gay, something he felt was an opportunity to explore the dynamic relationship of a gay character in a science fiction setting, as well as to explore the issue of homosexuality on a social level. In 2012, he guest-starred in the second season of the Jane Espenson–scripted romantic comedy web series Husbands.

From 2011 to 2017, Roiz was a series regular on Grimm, a supernatural/fantasy police procedural drama produced by Universal Television for NBC, staying on the regular cast for all 6 seasons of the show.

Roiz then went on to appear in Taken (2017 TV series), Lucifer (TV series), Nice Iranian Girl, The Detectives (2018 TV series), The Ballad of John St. George, The Order (TV series), Perfidy and FBI: International as well as having recurring roles on Salvation (TV series), Suits (American TV series), Departure (TV series), 9-1-1 (TV series), The Endgame and Chicago Med.

Additionally, he voice-acted for Superman: Red Son (film) in 2020 and Turning Red in 2022.

Filmography

Film

Television

Video games

References

External links
 
 
 Sasha Roiz profile at NBC.com

1973 births
21st-century Canadian male actors
Alumni of the Guildford School of Acting
Canadian male film actors
Canadian male television actors
Canadian male voice actors
Canadian people of Russian-Jewish descent
Israeli emigrants to Canada
Israeli people of Russian-Jewish descent
Jewish Canadian male actors
Jewish Israeli male actors
Living people
Male actors from Montreal
People from Tel Aviv